Charles Léopold Laurillard (21 January 1783 – 1853) was a French zoologist and paleontologist. His father died when he was 13, but he was able continue his studies. In 1803 he moved to Paris, and the following year he met Frédéric Cuvier, brother of Georges Cuvier, who was also a naturalist; they took Laurillard to the Musée National d'Histoire Naturelle, where he became the personal secretary of Georges Cuvier; he remained at the Museum even after Cuvier's death in 1832. He wrote several works of comparative anatomy and described a number of genera and species.

References

 Cardot, Claude (2012) Charles Léopold Laurillard 1783-1853: De l'ombre a la lumiere dans le sillage de Cuvier. Societe d'Emulation de Montbeliard.

External links
 Charles Léopold Laurillard

French naturalists
1783 births
1853 deaths
French paleontologists